Facial feminization surgery (FFS) is a set of reconstructive surgical procedures that alter typically male facial features to bring them closer in shape and size to typical female facial features. FFS can include various bony and soft tissue procedures such as brow lift, rhinoplasty, cheek implantation, and lip augmentation.

Faces contain secondary sex characteristics that make male and female faces readily distinguishable, including the shape of the forehead, nose, lips, cheeks, chin, and jawline; the features in the upper third of the face seem to be the most important, and subtle changes in the lips can have a strong effect.

Candidates
For some transgender women, FFS is medically necessary to treat gender dysphoria. It can be just as important or even more important than genital forms of sex reassignment surgery (SRS) in reducing gender dysphoria and helping trans women integrate socially as women; data on these sorts of outcomes are limited by small study size and confounding variables like other feminization procedures. While most FFS patients are transgender women, some cisgender women who feel that their faces are too masculine will also undergo FFS.

FFS candidates should wait until the bones of their skull have stopped growing before undergoing FFS. The way to determine if the bones of the skull have stopped growing is to take successive radiographs of the mandible and wrist bones to make sure that bone growth has stopped.

Surgical procedures
The surgical procedures most frequently performed during FFS include the following.

Upper third of face
Some studies have shown that the shape of the forehead is one of the key differences between cisgender males and cisgender females. Hairline correction, forehead recontouring, eye socket recontouring, and brow lift are procedures often performed at the same time, with rhinoplasty in mind.

Hairline correction
In males, the hairline is often higher than in females and usually has receded corners above the temples that give it an "M" shape. The hairline can be moved forward and given a more rounded shape, either with a procedure called a "scalp advance" wherein the scalp is lifted and repositioned, or with hair transplantation.

Forehead recontouring
Cisgender males tend to have a horizontal ridge of bone running across the forehead just above eyebrow level called the brow ridge (or "brow bossing"), which includes the "supraorbital rims" (the lower edge, on which the eyebrows sit). Cisgender males also tend to have indented temples and a flatter forehead than females.

The brow ridge is usually solid bone and can simply be ground down. The section of bossing between the eyebrows (the glabella) sits over a hollow area called the frontal sinus. The frontal sinus is hollow, and thus it can be more difficult to remove bossing there. If the bone over the frontal sinus is thick enough the bossing can be removed by simply grinding down the bone. However, in some people, the wall of bone is so thin that it is not possible to grind the bossing away completely without breaking through the wall into the frontal sinus.

FFS surgeons have taken two main approaches to resolving this problem. The most conservative approach is to grind down the wall of bone as far as possible without breaking through, and then build up the area around any remaining bossing with hydroxyapatite bone cement which can smooth out any visible step between remaining bossing and the rest of the forehead. In these cases, some additional reduction in the bossing can sometimes be achieved by thinning the soft tissues that sit over it. Alternatively, FFS surgeons can perform a procedure called a forehead reconstruction or cranioplasty where the glabella bone is taken apart, thinned and re-shaped, and reassembled in the new feminine position with small titanium wires or titanium orthopedic plate and screws. The data on which approach is better is limited and does not provide guidance. The risks of cranioplasty include the skull not healing properly, movement of the bone fragments, and the formation of cysts; these can usually be corrected by another procedure.

Brow lift
Cisgender men tend to have lower eyebrows relative to the position of their brow ridges when compared to cisgender women. Cis men's eyebrows tend to be below their brow ridges while cis women's eyebrows tend to be above their brow ridges. Accordingly, FFS to raise the eyebrows results in a face with a more womanly appearance.

Orbit recontouring
In some studies, the eye shape has been shown to be the key differentiating feature between cis males and females. Cis female eye sockets tend to be smaller, located higher on the face, to have more sharply angled outer edges, and to be closer together at their inner edges (the intercanthal distance).  Some FFS alter the orbit shape; data on outcomes is limited.

Rhinoplasty
Cis males tend to have larger, longer, and wider noses than cis females; also, the tip of the female nose will more often visibly point slightly upwards than that of a male. Hence, the procedure involves removing bone and cartilage and remodelling what remains. In most cases this is performed in an open procedure, but endonasal procedures have been used; in all cases when reducing the nose there is a risk of interfering with nasal valve function. Standard rhinoplasty procedures are generally used. There is limited data on outcomes.

Cheek implants
Cis females often have more forward projection in their cheekbones as well as fuller cheeks overall, with a triangle formed by the cheekbones and the point of the chin. Planning of cheek contouring is done while planning reshaping of the chin. The cheeks are reshaped by cutting away bone and repositioning the facial bones. Augmenting the cheeks with implants or with fat harvested from other parts of the body is common. Risks of implants include infection, and the implant moving and becoming asymmetrical; fat can eventually be absorbed.

Lips
Subtle changes to the shape and structure of lips can have a strong influence on feminization. The distance between the base of the nose and the top of the upper lip tends to be longer in males than in females and the upper lip is longer; when a female mouth is open and relaxed, the upper incisors are often exposed by a few millimeters.

An incision is usually made just under the base of the nose and a section of skin is removed. When the gap is closed it has the effect of lifting the top lip, placing it in a more feminine position and often exposing a little of the upper incisors. The surgeon can also use a lip lift to roll the top lip out a little, making it appear fuller.

Cis females often have fuller lips than cis males, so lip filling is often used in feminization. Injectable fillers are low-risk but tend to be absorbed after six months or so, and many implants have higher complication rates like infection or rejection. Use of fat harvested from the person can result in lumps and does not last long. The longest lasting and least risky results appear to arise from use of acellular dermis products.

Chin and jaw contouring
The chins of cis males tend to be longer and wider than those of cis females, with a more square base, and to project outward more than female chins. Cis male jawlines tend to extend outward from the chin at a wider angle than those of cis females, and to have a sharp corner at the back. Notably, however, many cis females have jaws and chins with these same characteristics.

The chin can be reduced in length either by bone shaving or with a procedure called a "sliding genioplasty", where a section of bone is removed. The jaw can be reshaped through jaw reduction surgery; sometimes this is done through the mouth. The chewing muscles can also be reduced to make the jaw appear narrower.

The biggest risk in these procedures is damage to the mental nerve that runs through the chin and jaw; other risks include damage to tooth roots, infection, nonunion, and damage to the mentalis muscle that controls the lower lip and is at the edges of the chin.

Adam's apple reduction
Males tend to have a much more prominent Adam's apple than females following puberty. The Adam's apple can be reduced with a procedure called a chondrolaryngoplasty; the goal of the procedure is to reduce the size without leaving a scar. There are risks of damage to the vocal cords and destabilization of the epiglottis.

Associated procedures
Beautification and rejuvenation procedures are often performed at the same time as facial feminisation. For example, it is common for eye bags and sagging eyelids to be corrected with a procedure called "blepharoplasty" and many feminization patients undergo a face and neck lift.

History
FFS techniques are derived from maxillofacial, otolaryngology, and plastic aesthetic and reconstructive surgery.

FFS began in 1982 when Darrell Pratt, a plastic surgeon who performed sex reassignment surgeries, approached Douglas Ousterhout with a request from a transgender woman patient of Pratt's; the patient wanted plastic surgery to make her face appear more feminine, since people still reacted to her as though she were a man. Ousterhout's prior practice had involved reconstructing faces and skulls of people who had had birth defects, accidents, or other trauma. Ousterhout was interested in helping but knew that he did not know what a "female face" was, so he investigated by first reading the physical anthropology from the early 20th century to identify what features were "female", then deriving measurements defining those features from a series of cephalograms taken in the 1970s, and then working with a set of several hundred skulls to see if he could reliably differentiate which were females and which were males using those measurements. Ousterhout then began working out what surgical techniques and materials he already used could be applied in order to transform a male face into a female face. He pioneered most of the procedures involved in FFS and was involved in their subsequent improvements as well.

Cost
In the US as of 2006, the procedure cost between $20,000 and $40,000, about twice the cost of sexual reassignment surgery. In Europe prices are considerably lower; as of 2017, a complete FFS costs between €10,000 and €25,000.

See also

 List of transgender-related topics
 Surgeons specializing in transgender medicine

References

External links
  A special edition of the Journal covering milestones and the ongoing development of transgender facial surgery as of 2019

Surgical procedures and techniques
Gender-affirming surgery (male-to-female)
Oral and maxillofacial surgery
Femininity
Plastic surgery
Otorhinolaryngology